Staré Město (in 1950–1996 Staré Město u Uherské Hradiště) is a town in Uherské Hradiště District in the Zlín Region of the Czech Republic. It has about 6,600 inhabitants.

Geography
Staré Město is located mostly in the Lower Morava Valley. A small western part of the municipal territory lies in the Kyjov Hills. Staré Město lies on the right bank of the Morava River, which forms the border with Uherské Hradiště. The Baťa Canal flows through the eastern part of the town.

History

In the 9th century, the area of Staré Město was part of Velingrad, one of two capital cities of the Great Moravian Empire. After the fall of Great Moravia, Velingrad lost its importance and became a village with two churches. The first written mention of Velingrad is from 1141. In 1205, the Cistercian monks founded nearby a monastery and named it Velehrad. The market village of Velingrad became their property. The Great Moravian rotunda was rebuilt to the parish Church of Saint Michael the Archangel in 1250. In 1321, Velingrad was renamed Staré Město.

In 1841, the railway was built. From 1971 to 1990, Staré Město was part of Uherské Hradiště. From 1990, it has been a separate municipality. Staré Město was hit by the 1997 Central European flood. In the same year, the municipality was promoted to a town.

Demographics

Sights
Staré Město is known for the Great Moravia Monument. It was built above the foundations of the first discovered Great Moravian building in Czech territory, which was the church "Na Valách". Great Moravia Monument is a museum with expositions dedicated to the Great Moravian Empire and life in the 9th century.

Kovozoo is a unique "zoo" with animals and other exhibits created from metal. It is an entertainment complex that also serves for environmetal education.

Notable people
Josef Panáček (1937–2022), sport shooter, Olympic Champion
Miroslav Grebeníček (born 1947), politician, former leader of the Communist Party of Bohemia and Moravia

Twin towns – sister cities

Staré Město is twinned with:
 Sées, France
 Tönisvorst, Germany

References

External links

Cities and towns in the Czech Republic
Populated places in Uherské Hradiště District
Moravian Slovakia